"It's Goin' Down" is a song from Disney Channel's 2017 television film Descendants 2, whose music and lyrics were composed by Antonina Armato, Tim James, Tom Sturges and Adam Schmalholz. The song was performed in the film by Dove Cameron, Sofia Carson, Cameron Boyce, Booboo Stewart, China Anne McClain, Mitchell Hope, Thomas Doherty and Dylan Playfair. The song peaked at number 77 in the Billboard Hot 100.

Charts

Certifications

References

Dove Cameron songs
China Anne McClain songs
Dance-pop songs
2016 songs
Songs written by Antonina Armato
Songs written by Tim James (musician)
Songs written by Tom Sturges
Songs from Descendants (franchise)
Songs written by IN-Q
Sofia Carson songs